Ruan de Swardt (born 21 January 1998) is a South African cricketer. He made his List A debut for Northerns in the 2017–18 CSA Provincial One-Day Challenge on 4 March 2018. In September 2018, he was named in Northerns' squad for the 2018 Africa T20 Cup. He made his first-class debut for Northerns in the 2018–19 CSA 3-Day Provincial Cup on 1 November 2018. He made his Twenty20 debut for Northerns in the 2019–20 CSA Provincial T20 Cup on 13 September 2019.

He was the leading run-scorer in the 2019–20 CSA Provincial One-Day Challenge, with 426 runs in seven matches. In July 2020, de Swardt was named as the CSA Student Cricketer of the Year. In April 2021, he was named in KwaZulu-Natal's squad, ahead of the 2021–22 cricket season in South Africa.

References

External links
 

1998 births
Living people
South African cricketers
Northerns cricketers
Place of birth missing (living people)